Mount Albert (abbreviated as Mt Albert) is a parliamentary electorate based around the suburb of Mount Albert in Auckland, New Zealand, returning one member of Parliament (MP) to the House of Representatives. It has elected only Labour Party MPs since it was first contested at the 1946 election. The incumbent MP is Jacinda Ardern, formerly Prime Minister of New Zealand, who was first elected in a 2017 by-election. The electorate was previously represented by David Shearer from 13 June 2009 to 31 December 2016; it was represented by Helen Clark from the 1981 general election until her resignation from Parliament on 17 April 2009.

The area that the electorate contains is notable for having produced three Labour prime ministers – Michael Joseph Savage, who represented the Auckland West electorate that Mt Albert was created out of in 1946; Helen Clark; and Jacinda Ardern. Additionally, David Shearer served as Labour Party leader in opposition. Warren Freer, who represented the electorate from 1947 to 1981, served as acting prime minister on three occasions.

Population centres
The 1941 New Zealand census had been postponed due to World War II, so the 1946 electoral redistribution had to take ten years of population growth and movements into account. The North Island gained a further two electorates from the South Island due to faster population growth. The abolition of the country quota through the Electoral Amendment Act, 1945 reduced the number and increased the size of rural electorates. None of the existing electorates remained unchanged, 27 electorates were abolished, eight former electorates were re-established, and 19 electorates were created for the first time, including Mount Albert.

Mount Albert covers a segment of the western Auckland isthmus, based around the suburb of Mount Albert and stretching from Kingsland on the eastern periphery of the central city down to Sandringham and extending as far as Avondale on the seat's western edge. Changes brought about by an electoral redistribution after the 2006 census saw a swap of suburbs with neighbouring  – Newton on the city fringe being returned to Auckland Central, having been moved out in 1999, and Point Chevalier being drafted in.

The present incarnation of Mount Albert dates to 1999, when the creation of the Mount Roskill seat necessitated removing the suburbs clustered around the north side of Manukau Harbour from the Owairaka electorate. The name Mount Albert had been out of use for only three years – before Owairaka was drawn up ahead of the change to Mixed Member Proportional voting in 1996, the Mount Albert electorate had been part of the New Zealand electoral landscape for fifty years.

History
Mount Albert was first created for the 1946 election. The electorate is known for being contested by three later prime ministers, Robert Muldoon, Helen Clark and Jacinda Ardern.

The first representative, Arthur Shapton Richards, died after only one year in the office.

This occasion was Muldoon's first attempt at entering Parliament. He tried to claim the seat from Labour, but no National Party candidate has ever managed to achieve what Muldoon also couldn't do. Mount Albert's inner-suburb, working-class composition makes it one of the Labour Party's safest seats.

Freer was succeeded by Helen Clark, who held the electorate until 1996, when it was abolished and she moved to the  electorate instead. Clark was Prime Minister from 1999 to 2008. In 2009, she resigned to become head of the United Nations Development Programme.

Clark was succeeded by David Shearer through the 13 June 2009 by-election. He was re-elected as MP in the 2011 and 2014 general elections. His appointment to lead the United Nation's peacekeeping mission in South Sudan resulted in a by-election in early 2017. After the by-election, Jacinda Ardern became the new representative for the electorate, and became Labour leader 8 weeks before the 2017 election after Andrew Little stepped down as Labour leader. Ardern also moved electorate from Auckland Central, and won the Mt. Albert MP role in the 2017 election.

Members of Parliament
Key

List MPs
Members of Parliament elected from party lists in elections where that person also unsuccessfully contested the Mount Albert electorate. Unless otherwise stated, all MPs terms began and ended at general elections.

Key

Election results

2020 election

2017 election

2017 by-election

2014 election

2011 election

Electorate (as at 26 November 2011): 45,208

2009 by-election

2008 election

2005 election

2002 election

1999 election

1993 election

1990 election

1987 election

1984 election

1981 election

1978 election

1975 election

1972 election

1969 election

1966 election

1963 election

1960 election

1957 election

1954 election

1951 election

1949 election

1947 by-election

1946 election

Table footnotes

Notes

References

External links
Electorate Profile  Parliamentary Library

New Zealand electorates in the Auckland Region
1946 establishments in New Zealand
1999 establishments in New Zealand
1996 disestablishments in New Zealand